Noah Van Sciver (born July 7, 1984) is an independent American cartoonist. He currently resides in Columbia, South Carolina.

Early life
Van Sciver grew up in a large family in New Jersey. A self-taught artist, he was influenced by many comics, including Ralph Snart Adventures and comics by Joe Matt and R. Crumb. He and his family were members of the Church of Jesus Christ of Latter-day Saints (LDS Church), but he is no longer a member. His brother Ethan is a comic book artist and an internet personality.

Comics
Van Sciver began producing  his one-person anthology Blammo in 2006, originally selling them for one dollar. His 4 Questions strip in Denver's alternative weekly, Westword, helped publicize his work when he started publishing it in 2007. After four issues of Blammo, Kilgore Books & Comics published subsequent issues. 

In 2010, he briefly campaigned to write and draw Howard the Duck as part of Marvel's Strange Tales series, but was turned down. 

His short story "Abby's Road," which originally appeared in Blammo #6, was selected for the Best American Comics 2012 anthology. Van Sciver's work has appeared in Mad magazine, and has been featured in The Comics Journal, Mome, and Mineshaft.

In October 2012, Fantagraphics Books published The Hypo: The Melancholic Young Lincoln, a narrative biography of Abraham Lincoln that spans the years 1837–1842. The Hypo, Van Sciver's first full-length graphic novel, earned positive critical praise, and made it onto several "best-of" lists for 2012, including MTV Geek (#3), Boing Boing (tied #3), Publishers Weekly Critic's Poll (#4), and was ranked as one of the Best Graphic Novels of 2012 by the Library Journal. 

In 2015, Fantagraphics released two Van Sciver graphic novels, St. Cole and Fante Bukowski.  Van Sciver stated in an interview that he based the character Fante Bukowski's experiences partially on his own experiences. The character Fante Bukowski is an aspiring writer hungry for recognition, and his name is a combination of the surnames of John Fante and Charles Bukowski. In a 2018 interview, Van Sciver said that he did not have plans to draw more Fante Bukowski books.

Also in 2015, Kilgore Books released Van Sciver's autobiographical mini comic My Hot Date, which won the 'Best Story' Ignatz Award at the Small Press Expo. 

For the 2015–2016 school year, Van Sciver was a fellow at the Center for Cartoon Studies in White River Junction, VT. He stopped publishing 4 Questions in 2015. 

In Van Sciver's autobiographical comic, One Dirty Tree (2018), he examined his childhood. He reported that his family was not happy with the comic, and Van Sciver felt bad for making his father a villain, when his father suffers from mental illness. John Wenzel at The Know described the comic's imagery as "uncanny, [and] deceptively casual."

Van Sciver drew the artwork for the graphic novel Grateful Dead Origins, which was written by Chris Miskiewicz.  The book tells the story of the early days of the rock band the Grateful Dead.  It is scheduled to be published by Z2 Comics in 2020.

Van Sciver uses Photoshop along with traditional media like radiograph pens, Higgins inks, colored pencils and watercolors. He keeps regular hours drawing, working each day from 9am until 5pm. He has used social media like Patreon and Twitter in the past to get immediate feedback on his work. He moved to Columbia, South Carolina, in 2018.

Awards
Van Sciver won the 2016 Ignatz award for Outstanding Story with the one-shot stand alone comic My Hot Date. He has been nominated for an Ignatz award many times:
2010 Outstanding Comic - Blammo #6 (Kilgore)
2012 Outstanding Minicomic - The Death of Elijah Lovejoy (2D Cloud)
2014 Outstanding Comic - Blammo #8 (Kilgore), 2015 Outstanding Graphic Novel - Saint Cole (Fantagraphics)
2015 Outstanding Artist - Saint Cole (Fantagraphics)
2015 Outstanding Graphic Novel - Saint Cole (Fantagraphics)
2016 Outstanding Artist - Disquiet (Fantagraphics)
2016 Outstanding Story - My Hot Date (Kilgore)
2020 Outstanding Collection - The Complete Works of Fante Bukowski (Fantagraphics)

In 2016, his graphic novel Fante Bukowski was nominee for a Best Writer/Artist Eisner Award.

Van Sciver has been shortlisted for two AML Awards from the Association for Mormon Letters: in 2015 for My Hot Date and 2018 for One Dirty Tree. He received the AML Award for One Dirty Tree.

Bibliography
The following is a mostly complete list of comics which contain solely content by Van Sciver. Collaborations, anthologies, and collections are listed in the table that follows.

The following is a list of collaborations, anthologies, and collections that feature Van Sciver's work.

The following is a list of webcomics and illustrations published online.

References

Sources consulted 
 Anthony, Davies. "A Short Chat with a Young Chap," Midnight Fiction (2008). Accessed May 27, 2013.
 Van Sciver entry, Fantagraphics website. Accessed May 27, 2013.

External links 
 
 Noah Van Sciver's Tumblr
 Review of The Hypo: The Melancholic Young Lincoln at Comic Book Resources
 Blammo #8 review at The Comics Beat
 Slate's review of The Hypo

Interviews 
 The Daily Crosshatch, 2011
 The Comics Journal, 2017
 CBR, 2017
 13 millones de naves, 2018
 Association for Mormon Letters, 2019
 Comics Beat, 2020

1984 births
American cartoonists
Living people
Harold B. Lee Library-related 21st century articles